Tony Leung may refer to:
 Tony Leung Chiu-wai (born 1962), Hong Kong actor known as "Little Tony"
 Tony Leung Ka-fai (born 1958), Hong Kong actor known as "Big Tony"

See also
Antony Leung (born 1952), Hong Kong businessman